José Manuel Martínez AKA El Mano Negra is a Mexican American former self-described Mexican drug cartel hitman. 
Martínez confessed to over 30 murders and was sentenced to life in prison after being convicted of murder in multiple states.

Crimes 

Martínez was arrested in May 2013 for the murder of Jose Ruiz, a friend of his daughter's boyfriend. During his interrogation by Alabama authorities, Martinez confessed to killing 36 people across at least 12 states.
All his victims were adult men, with the exception of one attempted victim that was a 17-year-old boy. Martinez said that most of his murders were related to debts to Mexican drug cartels. 
He may have killed more than 30 people in over 32 years.

Trials 

In Alabama, Martinez pled guilty to one count of murder for the death of Jose Ruiz and was sentenced to 50 years in prison in March 2013. In California, he pleaded guilty to nine counts of murder in October 2015, and was sentenced to life in prison without parole.

The June 2019 trial in Florida for two counts of murder lasted three weeks. The jury deliberated for three hours before deciding that Martinez would not face the death penalty which was sought by the state prosecution, and would instead face two consecutive life sentences. Over a dozen of Martinez's family members testified on his behalf, sharing stories describing the sacrifices he made to protect his siblings, and trips to Disneyland where he took his children and grandchildren. His defense lawyer for his Alabama court case, Thomas Turner, described him as "polite and a likeable individual", and another lawyer, John Spivey, said that it came down to two visions of Martinez, the "cold killer" vs the "truly dedicated father, uncle, grandfather," and that in the end, "the human side outweighed the monster side".

Further reading

References 

1962 births
20th-century American criminals
21st-century American criminals
American serial killers
Living people
Male serial killers
Mexican serial killers
Violence against men in North America